This is a list of lighthouses in Nicaragua.

Lighthouses

See also
 Lists of lighthouses

References

External links
 

Nicaragua
Lighthouses
Lighthouses